Karim Saddam Menshid (born 26 May 1960) is an Iraqi football forward who played for Iraq in the 1986 FIFA World Cup. He also played for many Iraqi clubs : Al Sinaa, Al Jaish, Al-Rasheed, Al Zawraa, Racing Club Beirut & Al Shorta, Karim Saddam  had been Top scorer of Iraqi League for 4 times. He scored unforgettable goal against UAE in 1986 FIFA World Cup Qualification which secured Iraq to go throw to the next stage.

Karim was born and brought in Sadr City in Baghdad and started his career with Al-Sinaa in 1979 before moving to Al-Jaish and Al-Rasheed. 

In 1983, he made his international debut against Egypt and played in the 1984 Olympics in Los Angeles. 

On 27 September 1985 in Taif, Saudi Arabia, Karim scored his most important international goal, when he scored in the last seconds of the game against the U.A.E, after coming on as a substitute only a few minutes previously in the 2nd round World Cup qualifier, had the score-line stayed the same before Karim had come on and scored, Iraq would have been eliminated but Karim’s goal made the game 2-1 to the Emirates, helping Iraq to a win on the away goals rule after Iraq had beaten the U.A.E 3-2, only a seven days before in Dubai. 

Iraq later went on to beat Syria and qualified for the World Cup finals in Mexico, where Karim started two games against Belgium and Mexico.

Career statistics

International goals
Scores and results list Iraq's goal tally first.

References

External links
FIFA profile

1960 births
Iraqi footballers
Iraqi expatriate footballers
Iraq international footballers
Association football forwards
1986 FIFA World Cup players
Living people
Olympic footballers of Iraq
Footballers at the 1984 Summer Olympics
Al-Shorta SC players
Al-Zawraa SC managers
Iraqi football managers
Expatriate footballers in Lebanon
Iraqi expatriate sportspeople in Lebanon
Racing Club Beirut players
Lebanese Premier League players